Terry Biggs is an Australian Paralympic table tennis player, athlete, and administrator. At the 1984 New York/Stoke Mandeville Games, he won a gold medal in the men's singles C1 table tennis event against Allen Francis from the United Kingdom, came sixth in the men's slalom C3 event, and came seventh in the men's club throw C3 event, He was one of the first Paralympic gold medallists with cerebral palsy. He was the Director of the Australian Paralympic Federation (now the Australian Paralympic Committee) from 1992 to 1995, and was the President of the Cerebral Palsy Australian Sport & Recreation Federation from 1992 to at least 2000. In 2000, he received an Australian Sports Medal.

References

Year of birth missing (living people)
Australian male athletes
Australian male table tennis players
Club throwers
Athletes (track and field) at the 1984 Summer Paralympics
Paralympic athletes of Australia
Table tennis players at the 1984 Summer Paralympics
Paralympic table tennis players of Australia
Medalists at the 1984 Summer Paralympics
Paralympic medalists in table tennis
Paralympic gold medalists for Australia
Recipients of the Australian Sports Medal
Cerebral Palsy category Paralympic competitors
Sportspeople with cerebral palsy
Living people